Leonardo Candellone (born 15 September 1997) is an Italian professional footballer who plays as a forward for  club Pordenone, on loan from Napoli.

Club career

Torino 
Born in Turin, Candellone was a youth exponent of Torino.

Loan to Gubbio 
On 15 July 2016, Candellone was signed by Serie C side Gubbio on a season-long loan deal. On 27 August, Candellone made his debut for Gubbio in a 1–1 away draw against Pordenone, he was replaced by Lorenzo Musto in the 70th minute. On 3 September he scored his first professional goal, as a substitute, in the 75th minute of a 1–0 home win over Südtirol. On 10 September he played his first entire match for Gubbio, a 1–0 away win over Lumezzane. On 26 November, Candellone scored his second in the 27th minute of a 3–0 away win over Mantova. On 4 December he scored his third goal in the 32nd minute of a 3–2 home defeat against Reggiana. On 30 April 2017, Candellone received a red card, as a substitute, in the 88th minute of a 3–0 away defeat against Bassano Virtus. Candellone ended his loan to Gubbio with 35 appearances, 6 goals and 2 assists.

Loan to Ternana and Südtirol 
On 8 August 2017, Candellone was loaned to Serie B club Ternana on a season-long loan deal. On 21 October he made his Serie B debut as a substitute replacing Luca Tremolada in the 84th minute of a 1–1 home draw against Ascoli. On 24 October he played his second match for Ternana, again as a substitute replacing Alessandro Favalli in the 65th minute of a 4–2 away defeat against Frosinone. On 18 November, Candellone played his third match as a substitute replacing Adriano Montalto in the 76th minute of a 1–1 away draw against Foggia. In January 2018, Candellone was re-called to Torino leaving Ternana with only 3 appearances, all as a substitute.

On 11 January 2018, Candellone was signed by Serie C club Südtirol on a 6-month loan deal. On 20 January, Candellone made his Serie C debut for Südtirol as a substitute replacing Rocco Costantino in the 57th minute and he scored his first goal in the 63rd minute of a 1–0 away win over Fermana. On 10 February, Candellone played his first match as a starter for Südtirol, a 2–1 home defeat against Gubbio, he was replaced by Rocco Costantino in the 56th minute. On 29 April he scored twice in a 2–1 away win over Ravenna. Candellone ended his 6-month loan to Südtirol with 19 appearances, 5 goals and 2 assists.

Loan to Pordenone 
On 31 July 2018, Candellone was loaned to Serie C club Pordenone on a season-long loan deal. On 5 August he made his debut for Pordenone in a match lost 4–3 at penalties after a 2–2 away draw against Pescara in second round of Coppa Italia. On 18 September he made his Serie C debut and he scored his first goal for Pordenone in the 34th minute of a 2–1 home win over Fano, he played the entire match. One week later, on 23 September, he scored his second goal in the 34th minute of a 2–1 away win over AlbinoLeffe. Three days later, Candellone scored his third consecutive goal and the decisive goal of the match in the 42nd minute of a 1–0 home win over Virtus Verona. Candellone ended his season-long loan to Pordenone with 39 appearances, including 38 of them as a starter, 16 goals and 3 assists.

On 24 July 2019, Candellone returned to Pordenone with another season-long loan. On 11 August 2019, Candellone played his first match of the season in a 2–1 home defeat against FeralpiSalò in the second round of Coppa Italia. he was replaced by Gaetano Monachello in the 62nd minute. On 1 September he made his league debut for Pordenone as a substitute replacing Patrick Ciurria in the 77th minute of a 4–2 away defeat against Pescara. On 13 September he played his first match as a starter in Serie B, a 1–0 home win over Spezia, he was replaced after 65 minutes by Patrick Ciurria. On 17 January 2020, Candellone scored his first goal in Serie B in the 29th minute of a 2–2 away draw against Frosinone. Candellone ended his second season at the club with 34 appearances, 2 goals and 3 assist.

Napoli
On 19 September 2020, his rights were purchased by Napoli.

Loan to Bari 
On the same day Napoli immediately sent him to Bari on a two-year loan with an option to purchase. Four days later, on 23 September, he made his debut for the club as a substitute replacing Manuel Marras in the 46th minute and in the 75th minute he scored his first goal for the club in a 4–0 home win over Travestere in the first round of Coppa Italia. Four days later, he made his league debut for the club as a substitute replacing again Manuel Marras in the 66th minute of a 3–2 away win over Virtus Francavilla. On 7 October, Candellone played his first match as a starter for the club in Serie C, a 3–2 away win over Cavese, he was replaced by Eugenio D'Ursi after 66 minutes. Five weeks later, on 11 November, he played his first entire match for Bari, a 4–1 away win over Potenza. Candellone ended his first season to Bari with 28 appearances, 9 of them as a starter, 1 goal and 2 assists. However in July 2021 his loan was interrupped and he returned to Napoli.

Loan to Südtirol 
On 16 July 2021, he returned to Südtirol on loan.

Return to Pordenone
On 31 January 2022, Candellone returned to Pordenone on a new loan until 30 June 2023, with an option to buy.

Career statistics

Club

Honours

Club 
Torino Primavera

Campionato Nazionale Primavera: 2014–15
 Supercoppa Primavera: 2016

Pordenone 

 Serie C (Group B): 2018–19
 Supercoppa di Serie C: 2019

References

External links
 

1997 births
Living people
Footballers from Turin
Italian footballers
Association football forwards
Serie B players
Serie C players
Torino F.C. players
A.S. Gubbio 1910 players
Ternana Calcio players
F.C. Südtirol players
Pordenone Calcio players
S.S.C. Napoli players
S.S.C. Bari players